The blacksmith tree frog (Boana faber), or smith frog, is a frog species in the family Hylidae. It is found in eastern to southern Brazil, north-eastern Argentina and south-eastern Paraguay. Breeding takes place in temporary and permanent pools (including artificial pools) and slow-moving streams where the frogs make nests.

This is an abundant species throughout its range. Clear cutting of forests remains a threat, whereas the species adapts to selectively logged and second growth forests. It is present in several protected areas. It is not considered threatened by the IUCN.

References

Boana
Amphibians of Brazil
Amphibians of Argentina
Amphibians of Paraguay
Taxa named by Prince Maximilian of Wied-Neuwied
Amphibians described in 1821
Taxonomy articles created by Polbot